Norbert Rivasz-Tóth (born 6 May 1996) is a Hungarian track and field athlete who competes in the javelin throw. His personal best of 83.08 m, set in 2017, is the Hungarian record. He has represented his nation at the 2017 World Championships. In addition, he won the gold medal at the 2017 European U23 Championships.

International competitions

References

1996 births
Living people
Hungarian male javelin throwers
World Athletics Championships athletes for Hungary
People from Törökszentmiklós
Hungarian Athletics Championships winners
Competitors at the 2017 Summer Universiade
Competitors at the 2019 Summer Universiade
Athletes (track and field) at the 2020 Summer Olympics
Olympic athletes of Hungary
Sportspeople from Jász-Nagykun-Szolnok County